Gregory Squires (born July 6, 1988) is an American professional ice hockey winger who is currently playing under contract with Södertälje SK of the HockeyAllsvenskan (Allsv).

Playing career
After graduating from Ann Arbor Huron High School, Squires played for Western Michigan University from 2008–12.

In his first year with the Broncos, Squires played in 41 games and was named a CCHA All-Rookie Team Honorable Mention for his efforts. In February, while playing on a line with senior Patrick Galivan, Squires was the CCHA's top scoring rookie, earning him Rookie of the Month honors. He had also been named Rookie of the Month for January as well.

In his junior year, he played in all 42 games of the season and finished fourth on the team in points with 28. He helped guide the Broncos to the 2011 CCHA Men's Ice Hockey Tournament where he assisted on the overtime goal that helped send the Broncos to the Semifinals for the first time in 17 years. He also assisted in the 5–2 win over the University of Michigan in the CCHA Semifinals to help the Broncos reach the CCHA Championship Finals for the first time since 1986. The Broncos later lost to Miami in the CCHA Championship game, with Squires picking up one assist.

Following his collegiate career, Squires signed an ECHL contract with the Stockton Thunder. After playing two games, Squires joined the Starbulls Rosenheim for the 2012–13 season.  After one season with Rosenheim, Squires joined the Bietigheim Steelers for the 2013–14 season. Moving on from the German league, Squires joined IK Oskarshamn of the HockeyAllsvenskan in 2014. Squires later joined the Swedish Hockey League's Örebro HK for the 2015–16 season.

Despite agreeing to a contract extension with Örebro, Squires agreed to join the Kunlun Red Star of the Kontinental Hockey League in April 2017. On October 11, 2019, Squires signed a contract with HC TPS. Squires played just 14 regular season games in the Liiga, before leaving Finland to play the remainder of the season with Swiss club, the Ticino Rockets of the Swiss League (SL), affiliate of  HC Lugano of the National League (NL).

After sitting out the 2020–21 season, Squires returned to the professional circuit in re-joining former club, Kunlun Red Star of the KHL, on July 22, 2021. Squires contributed with 2 goals and 3 points through 27 regular season games with Kunlun before leaving the club and returning to continue his career in Sweden by joining Allsvenskan club, Södertälje SK, for the remainder of the 2021–22 season on 25 December 2021.

Career statistics

Regular season and playoffs

International

Awards and honors

References

External links
 

1988 births
Living people
American men's ice hockey right wingers
Graz 99ers players
HC Kunlun Red Star players
HC TPS players
Ice hockey players from New York (state)
IK Oskarshamn players
Indiana Ice players
KRS Heilongjiang players
Örebro HK players
People from White Plains, New York
SC Bietigheim-Bissingen players
Södertälje SK players
Sportspeople from New York City
Starbulls Rosenheim players
Stockton Thunder players
HCB Ticino Rockets players
USA Hockey National Team Development Program players
Western Michigan Broncos men's ice hockey players